Adult service provider may refer to:

 A caregiver for adults; an individual or organization providing health care or personal care to adults
 A business or individual in the sex industry